Bernat de Sarrià (or Bernard, c. 1260 – 30 July 1335), was nobleman, diplomat, and admiral of the Crown of Aragon.

References 

1335 deaths
Spanish diplomats
Admirals
Year of birth uncertain